Aspidothelium is a genus of lichen-forming fungi in the family Thelenellaceae. All species in the genus have a tropical distribution and are crustose with a  photobiont partner. Most Aspidothelium species are foliicolous (leaf-dwelling), although some corticolous (bark-dwelling) species are known, as well as a single saxicolous (rock-dwelling) member.

Taxonomy

The genus was circumscribed by Finnish lichenologist Edvard August Vainio in 1890. Historically, it has at times been considered as a synonym of genus Thelenella. Families in which the genus has previously been classified are the Verrucariaceae, Strigulaceae, and the Aspidotheliaceae, a monogeneric family circumscribed especially to contain this genus. Modern molecular phylogenetic analysis has shown its placement in the family Thelenellaceae, allied with the order Ostropales.

Description

These perithecia often exhibit wart-like, setae, or disc-like structures on their surface. Within the perithecia, dense and unbranched  and  can be found alongside clavate asci and colourless ascospores. Aspidothelium is particularly notable for its unique characteristic of producing fusiform ascospores with numerous transverse septa and short, broad cells.

Species

 Aspidothelium arachnoideum  – Costa Rica
 Aspidothelium cuyabense 
 Aspidothelium gemmiferum  – Papua New Guinea
 Aspidothelium glabrum  – Costa Rica
 Aspidothelium hirsutum  – Ethiopia
 Aspidothelium lueckingii  – Bolivia
 Aspidothelium macrosporum 
 Aspidothelium mirabile  – Ecuador
 Aspidothelium ornatum  – Ecuador
 Aspidothelium papillicarpum  – Costa Rica
 Aspidothelium scutellicarpum  – Ecuador
 Aspidothelium silverstonei  – Colombia
 Aspidothelium submuriforme  – Argentina
 Aspidothelium trichothelioides  – Africa & tropical America
 Aspidothelium verruculosum  – tropical Asia & Australia

References

Ostropales
Lichen genera
Taxa described in 1890
Taxa named by Edvard August Vainio